Pete Caringi (born March 27, 1955) is an American soccer coach who is the head coach for the University of Maryland, Baltimore County men's soccer team. He was named the 2014 National Soccer Coaches Association of America Division I Coach of the Year.

Playing career
A former All-American and Three time captain, He played college soccer for the University of Baltimore.A four time first team all conference and two time All-South All-American In 1973 they lost in the final four to Cal Fullerton. In 1975 the Baltimore team won the NCAA National Championship in Seattle defeating Seattle-Pacific 3–1 in front of over 7,500 fans. Caringi's 2 Goals led the Bees in the final He still holds the All-Time Record for goals with 70.[He signed  for the Washington Diplomats in 1978. He is a member of the University of Baltimore athletic hall of fame. Caringi is also a member of the Maryland Soccer Hall of Fame, CCBC Athletic Hall of Fame, Region XX Hall of Fame, NJCAA National Soccer Hall of Fame and just recently was inducted into the UMBC Athletics Hall of Fame 

Coaching career  Head Coach :  Highlight of his coaching career was American Professional Soccer League Champions in 1990 with the Maryland Bays. The Bays finished 20–5 sweeping thru the play-offs and winning the Finals against a very good San Francisco Black Hawks team.
A former coach at Essex Community College (81–90)He led Essex to seven JuCo championships and five Region XX Titles. His 84 and 89 teams played in the NJCAA National Finals. He was named NJCAA National Coach of the Year in 84 and 89. He has been the head coach of UMBC Retrievers soccer since 1991. He led UMBC to the NCAA Tournament in 99 and the  2nd Round in 2010,12,13 His 2014 College Cup semifinals, Caringi was named the NSCAA Division I Coach of the Year and the Soccer America Coach of the Year. H

References

External links
UMBC bio

1955 births
Living people
UMBC Retrievers men's soccer coaches
University of Baltimore alumni
American soccer players
Association football forwards
American soccer coaches
Baltimore Bees men's soccer players
Washington Diplomats (NASL) players